Richard (real name: Walter) Hanke (18 March 1910 – 2 September 1980) was a German international footballer. He left Germany and went professional in 1931 which was most unusual at the time, spending eight seasons in Austria, Czechoslovakia and France.

Soon after joining Wiener AC he was in the team that finished runners-up in the 1931 Mitropa Cup. He scored in both finals but asked for a transfer only a few weeks later. Hanke subsequently joined DSV Saaz during that same season. In later years, he was with SK Prostějov for a while and then, during the second half of the 1930s, found success in France.

Hanke has signed autograph pictures as Walter Hanke. For unknown reasons, he was mistakenly referred to as Richard in later years.

Some sources have confused Walter and Josef Hanke, an Austrian player who was with a couple of (different) French clubs at the same time.

References

External links
 Profile - FC Metz

1910 births
1980 deaths
Sportspeople from Wrocław
Association football forwards
German footballers
Germany international footballers
Le Havre AC players
FC Metz players
Stade Rennais F.C. players
Ligue 1 players